Alan Devine (born 1970) is an Irish actor.

Early life and education
Devine was born in County Galway in 1970. He has played minor roles in several films. Devine graduated with honours from Trinity College Dublin, where he studied philosophy and sociology. He has since pursued a career of acting in both film and on the stage. There his credits include numerous stage roles, including various works of Shakespeare.

Career
Devine appeared in the rural drama Glenroe during the 1990s as Ray O'Driscoll, who fled the country after he killed his brother Oliver in 1999. This storyline was one of the biggest storylines the show had in the 1990s.

His film roles include portraying the Irish criminal Gerry “The Monk” Hutch in the movie Veronica Guerin. He has received credit for work in several other films and television including King Arthur, Nora, Ghostwood (where he played the lead), The Tudors, Vikings, and The Gift.

Devine appeared in TV commercials for Guinness playing the part of Tom Crean, the legendary Arctic explorer from County Kerry.

He subsequently appeared in the Irish soap opera Fair City as Louie Gleeson. In 2010, Devine appeared on stage in the play My First Time alongside Leigh Arnold, Alan Shortt and Claire Tully in different venues across Ireland. He played the Earl of Kent in the recent Netflix series Valhalla.

Filmography
Valhalla (2022)
The Gift (2017)
Vikings (2016)
Tudors (2014)
Fair City (2008-2012)
Ghostwood (2006)
An Teanga Runda (2005)
King Arthur (2004)
The Honourable Scaffolder (2003)
Veronica Guerin (2003)
Flick (2000)
Blatant Disregard (2000)
Nora (2000)
Miracle at Midnight (1998)
Home (short) (1998)
Angela Mooney (1996)
Frankie Starlight (1995)

See also
 List of Fair City characters

References

External links
 
 Filmbug: Alan Devine

Living people
Alumni of Trinity College Dublin
Irish male film actors
Irish male soap opera actors
Irish male stage actors
People from County Galway
1970 births